Cerithiopsis pesa is a species of sea snail, a gastropod in the family Cerithiopsidae. It was described by Dall and Bartsch, in 1911.

References

pesa
Gastropods described in 1911